Hitchings is a surname. Notable people with the surname include:

 George H. Hitchings (1905-1998), American doctor who shared the 1988 Nobel Prize in Physiology
 Helen Hitchings (1920–2002), New Zealand art dealer
 Henry Hitchings (born 1974), British author, reviewer and critic 
 Lionel Hitchings (born 1936), English cricketer

See also
 Hitching (disambiguation)
 Hitchin (disambiguation)